Mendiola is a village and council located in the municipality of Vitoria-Gasteiz, in Álava province, Basque Country, Spain. As of 2020, it has a population of 251.

Geography 
Mendiola is located 8km south-southeast of Vitoria-Gasteiz.

References

Populated places in Álava